Charles Gascoigne (1738–1806) was a British industrialist at the beginning of the Industrial Revolution.  He was a partner and manager of the Carron Company ironworks in its early years, but left in 1786, before the company's success became obvious, to reorganise the production of iron and cannon in Ukraine.  He remained in Ukraine for 20 years, until his death.

Early life
Charles Gascoigne was born in 1738 in England. His father was Captain Woodroffe Gascoigne, who was deployed in Scotland after the Battle of Culloden in 1746. His mother was Grizel, eldest daughter of Charles Elphinstone, 9th Lord Elphinstone and his wife Elizabeth Primrose.

Career
He worked for the British East India Company and as a partner in "Coney and Gascoigne", a firm of drysalters in London.  He married Mary, the daughter of Samuel Garbett, at St Martin's, Birmingham, in 1759.  Garbett was a founding partner in the Carron Company, also founded in 1759, and Gascoigne become a partner in the ironworks in 1765, having been manager of Garbett's nearby turpentine factory, Garbett & Co., since 1763.

Carron Company
When he joined the Carron Company only six years after it was founded, and it was still suffering from problems with the quality of its iron.  Nevertheless, the Board of Ordnance had granted it a lucrative contract to supply armaments to the British armed forces in 1764.  He became managing partner of the ironworks in 1769, taking over from William Cadell, Jr, the son of William Cadell, another founder of the works.

He introduced many improvements in the company's techniques of production, and devoted considerable effort to increasing the quality of its work.  Despite (or perhaps because of) Gascoigne's influence, the Carron Company and Garbett's other enterprises remained in a difficult financial position. Garbett & Co. collapsed under the weight of debts in 1772, harming Gascoigne's relationship with his father-in law.  The Board of Ordnance eventually withdrew their contract with Carron Company for long guns in 1773, as a result of concerns over the poor quality of their workmanship

The company received a royal charter to incorporate as the Carron Company in 1773.  However, despite his efforts, the quality of company's products had remained low.  After the company's contracts to supply the Royal Navy were cancelled in 1773, the company's cannon were removed from all naval vessels.

Carronades
Undeterred, he also pushed forward the development of a new type of cannon, originally known as the "Gasconade" or "Melvillade", but better known by its later name, the "Carronade".  The carronade was designed as a short-range naval weapon with a low muzzle velocity, and is said to have been invented by Lieutenant General Robert Melville in 1759.  It was developed by Gascoigne from 1769 to 1779. It was adopted by the Royal Navy in 1779.

Easily identified by its considerably shortened barrel, the carronade had the same calibre as a long gun, but contained much less metal and so was much lighter, enabling naval vessels to carry many more carronades than long guns.  The resulting short range was not a problem as a result of the close-to broadside tactics employed at the time.  The new weapon was a considerable success (earning the nickname "The Smasher" by Royal Navy crews) and remained in production from 1778 through to the 1850s.  In addition to the Royal Navy, the company also supplied armaments to governments outside the UK, including weapons supplied to the embryonic United States which were used against Britain in the War of 1812.

Russia

In the 1770s and 1780s, the British government were involved in a programme to render military assistance to the Russian Empire.  A steam engine, designed by John Smeaton and manufactured by the Carron Company, was ordered by Charles Knowles (then working for the Russians) and was sent to Russia in 1774, together with a supply of coal and Carron workmen.

In 1784, Knowle's successor, Admiral Samuel Greig, ordered guns for the Russian Navy from the Carron Company.  In an effort to improve Catherine the Great's weapons foundry at Petrozavodsk, the Russians also ordered a large quantity of plant and equipment. The British government tried to prevent the company from supplying this cutting-edge military technology; nonetheless, Gascoigne delivered the Russians' orders.  Then, in May 1786, he travelled to Kronstadt to supervise the installation works at the Aleksandrovsky foundry, accompanied by workers from the Carron Company.  He was also accompanied by Charles Baird, Adam Armstrong, and Alexander Wilson.  Gascoigne was in financial trouble at the time, having been declared bankrupt.

Gascoigne was to remain in Russia for twenty years, where he became known as Karl Karlovich Gaskoin (Карл Гаскойн).  He became a State Councillor and a Knight of Saint Vladimir, received the Order of St Anne, 1st and 2nd classes, received the rank of Councillor of State, and was head of all mines and foundries in Karelia, including the mines at Petrozavodsk (Olonets Province, Russia).  He improved many existing Russian iron foundries and built new ones, and also advancing the Russian's cannon-manufacturing techniques.  He established the first machine presses at the Saint Petersburg Mint, although the project was ultimately completed by Matthew Boulton.

Personal life
He had three daughters by his first wife: Anne, who married Thomas Hamilton, 7th Earl of Haddington, in 1786; Elizabeth, who married an MP, George Augustus Pollen; and Maria, who married .

He married his second wife, Anastasia Jessie Guthrie (1782-1855), daughter of Dr. Matthew Guthrie, in 1797, when she was only 15, and he was 59.

Death
He died in July 1806 in Kolpino near St. Petersburg, and was buried in Petrozavodsk.

Legacy
His reputation has undergone many revisions. In Britain, he was seen as a traitor. In Russia, particularly in the Soviet period, he was suspected as a self-seeking capitalist and an industrial spy.

See also
Abbotshaugh Community Woodland

References

Charles Gascoigne – The Darling of Carron Works
Charles Gascoigne – К. К. Гаскойн – a Russian language article from Olonetskiie Gubernskiie Vegomosti, 1843, No. 13
Falkirk Local History Society
Britons in Karelia
Francis Steuart, Scottish Influences in Russian History, Glasgow, 1913, extracts (p.129-131)
Charles Gascoigne, a Scot remembered in Petrozavodsk

1738 births
1806 deaths
English businesspeople
Russian people of English descent
British East India Company people
Recipients of the Order of St. Vladimir, 3rd class
Recipients of the Order of St. Anna, 1st class